Remembering White Lion is an album by White Lion featuring new re-recorded versions of their classic songs from previous studio albums, including the band's biggest three hits: "When the Children Cry", "Wait", and "Little Fighter".

Background
Following three albums as the lead singer of the hard rock band Freak of Nature, Mike Tramp started a solo career releasing his debut album Capricorn in 1998 and also reformed White Lion with all new musicians. The original members left the band following the last White Lion studio album Mane Attraction in 1991 and had no interest in reforming the original band.

To avoid legal issues with former members, the band was known as Tramp's White Lion when this album was re-released in 2004 under the title Last Roar.

Release
The re-recorded "When the Children Cry" was released as a promo and later an iTunes single and was also released on several mixed compilation albums. In 2004, an acoustic version of "When the Children Cry" was recorded and featured on the VH1 Classic Metal Mania: Stripped compilation. 

The album has been re-released under different titles and album covers several times, apart from the original 1999 release and the first re release as Last Roar in 2004, there has been several more versions including
Ultimate Collection in 2005, The Ultimate White Lion in 2006, Portrait of the Lion in 2009, White Lion Greatest Hits in 2011 and White Lion Compilation in 2012.

Track listing
"All the Fallen Men" - 4:45
"Warsong" - 5:49
"El Salvador" - 4:59
"Wait" - 7:00
"Little Fighter" - 4:55
"When the Children Cry" - 6:18
"Fight to Survive" - 6:23
"Living on the Edge" - 5:41
"She's Got Everything" - 4:26
"Lonely Nights" - 4:56
"Broken Home" - 5:46
"Till Death Do Us Part" - 3:45

Band members
 Mike Tramp - vocals
 Kasper Damgaard - guitar
 Nils Kroyer - bass guitar
 Bjarne T. Holm - drums
 Dan Hemmer - Hammond B-3 organ

References

External links
Official White Lion website
Official Mike Tramp website

1999 albums
Cleopatra Records albums
White Lion albums